Liau Huei-fang is a Taiwanese politician. She was the Deputy Minister of Labor from 20 May 2016 until 27 November 2017.

Education
Liau obtained her bachelor's and master's degree in law from National Chengchi University. She obtained her doctoral degree in social studies from Tunghai University.

Early career

Ministry of Labor

Minister appointment
Liau was appointed as the Deputy Minister of Labor by Premier Lin Chuan on 28 April 2016 and took office on 20 May in the same year.

Minister resignation
Liau first tendered her resignation to Miniter Lin Mei-chu from the deputy minister position on 13 November 2017 and again on 19 November 2017 citing career issues. On 27 November 2017, her resignation was approved by President Tsai Ing-wen and she was replaced by Su Li-chiung.

References

Year of birth missing (living people)
Living people
Taiwanese Ministers of Labor
Women government ministers of Taiwan
National Chengchi University alumni
Tunghai University alumni
Taiwanese trade union leaders
Women trade union leaders